The 1891 Yale Bulldogs football team represented Yale University in the 1891 college football season. The team finished with a 13–0 record and a 488-0 season score.  It was retroactively named as the national champion by the Billingsley Report, Helms Athletic Foundation, Houlgate System, National Championship Foundation, and Parke H. Davis. Yale's 1891 season was part of a 37-game winning streak that began with the final game of the 1890 season and stopped at the end of the 1893 season. 

Five Yale players were selected by Caspar Whitney to the 1891 All-America college football team: halfback and team captain Lee McClung; ends Frank Hinkey and John A. Hartwell; tackle Wallace Winter; and guard Pudge Heffelfinger. Camp also selected the following Yale players to his second team: quarterback Frank Barbour; halfback Laurie Bliss; guard Samuel Morison; and center George Sanford.

Schedule

Game summaries

YMCA Training School
Yale alumnus Amos Alonzo Stagg was the coach of the YMCA team and also played at the halfback position. Pudge Heffelfinger scored three touchdowns, and Lee McClung kicked three goals after touchdown. Halfback and team captain Lee McClung suffered a broken thumb in the game.

References

Yale
Yale Bulldogs football seasons
College football national champions
College football undefeated seasons
Yale Bulldogs football